Lisnave is a ship repair company based in Setúbal, Portugal.

History
The Rocha Shipyards were founded in 1937 and renamed to Lisnave–Estaleiros Navais de Lisbo in 1961. Starting in 1967 the shipyards focused mainly on ship repair rather than on new construction. That year, new large shipyards went into operation at Margueira.

In 1973 a new shipbuilding and ship repair yard was built at Mitrena in Setúbal. In 1997 a restructuring plan was undertaken that was completed in 2000 with the closure of the Margueira Yard. Subsequently operations are mainly performed in Mitrena Yard.

References

Shipyards of Portugal